Senacre Technology College was a secondary school in Maidstone, Kent.
 
The school became a Technology College in September 1994.

The school closed in 2008 and the pupils transferred to the New Line Learning Academy.

References

2008 disestablishments in England
Defunct schools in Kent
Educational institutions disestablished in 2008
Educational institutions with year of establishment missing